Danny Kroes (born 5 November 1999) is a Dutch racing driver currently competing in the TCR International Series and TCR Benelux Touring Car Championship. Having previously competed in the SMP F4 Championship and F4 Spanish Championship amongst others.

Racing career
Kroes began his career in 2011 in Karting, he continued in karting until 2015. In 2016 he switched to the SMP F4 Championship, he finished the season twelfth in the championship standings that year. He also raced in the F4 Spanish Championship finishing eleventh in the standings. For 2017 he switched to the TCR Benelux Touring Car Championship, driving a SEAT León TCR for Ferry Monster Autosport partnering Pepe Oriola.

In June 2017 it was announced that he would race in the TCR International Series, driving an SEAT León TCR for his TCR Benelux team Ferry Monster Autosport.

in 2018 he competed in the TCR Europe series with Cupra TCR. He achieved a podium finish in onlY his second race at Zandvoort but suffered from bad luck and mechanical failures throughout the season.

In 2019 Kroes switched to Lamborghini and partnered with Russian driver Sergei Afanasiev. They won the Lamborghini Super Trofeo Pro class championship with their team, Bonaldi Motorsport. Kroes also took pole position, fastest race lap and a class win in the 24 Hours of Zolder, also in a Lamborghini Huracán Super Trofeo Run by Leipert Motorsport. At the world finals in Jerez, Kroes and Afanasiev took a third place, also with Bonaldi Motorsport.

Racing record

Career summary

† As he was a guest driver, Kroes was ineligible to score points.

Complete TCR International Series results
(key) (Races in bold indicate pole position) (Races in italics indicate fastest lap)

Complete TCR Europe Series results
(key) (Races in bold indicate pole position) (Races in italics indicate fastest lap)

References

External links
 

1999 births
Living people
TCR International Series drivers
Dutch racing drivers
Spanish F4 Championship drivers
SMP F4 Championship drivers
MP Motorsport drivers
Euronova Racing drivers
TCR Europe Touring Car Series drivers
Lamborghini Super Trofeo drivers